The 2022 Uzbekistan Super League (known as the Coca-Cola Uzbekistan Super League for sponsorship reasons) was the 31st season of top-level football in Uzbekistan since its establishment on 1992. Pakhtakor Tashkent were the defending champions from the 2021 campaign, and successfully defended their title.

Season events

Teams

Managerial changes

Foreign players

The number of foreign players is restricted to five per USL team. A team can use only five foreign players on the field in each game.

In bold: Players that have been capped for their national team.

League table

Results

Results table

Results by match played

Positions by round

Relegation play-offs
The relegation play-offs took place on 25 November 2022.

Matches

Turon won 2–1 on aggregate, and promotion to 2023 Super League.

Season Statistics
 First goal of the season: Shakhzod Ubaydullaev for Neftchi Fergana against Kokand 1912

Goalscorers

Attendances

By round

By team

Awards

Monthly awards

See also
2022 Uzbekistan Pro League 
2022 Uzbekistan Pro-B League 
2022 Uzbekistan Second League
2022 Uzbekistan Cup 
2022 Uzbekistan League Cup

References

Uzbekistan
Uzbekistan Super League seasons
2022 in Uzbekistani football